Events from the year 1992 in Russia

Incumbents
 President of Russia – Boris Yeltsin (Democratic Party of Russia)
 Vice President of Russia – Alexander Rutskoy (Patriots of Russia)
 Prime Minister of Russia – 
 until 15 June: Boris Yeltsin (Democratic Party of Russia) 
 15 June–14 December: vacant 
 starting 14 December: Viktor Chernomyrdin (Our Home – Russia)

Events 
 January 2 - RTR channel began airing Santa Barbara, which would become the longest-running foreign TV series on Russian television (although only episodes from 217th to 2,040th were aired).

Sport

Notable births in 1992 

 January 1 - Daniil Apalkov, ice hockey player
 January 2 - Anna Arina Marenko, tennis player
 January 18 - Karen Akopyan, footballer
 January 21 - Almaz Askarov, footballer
 January 31 - Alexandr Loginov, biathlete
 February 6 - Sean Babas, commercial, music video and motion picture film director
 March 8 - Vitaly Zdorovetskiy, online prankster
 April 1 - Alex Gilbert, New Zealand-based adoption advocate
 April 3 - Artur Amirov, ice hockey player
 April 12 - Denis Barantsev, ice hockey defenceman
 May 18 - Nina Petushkova, figure skater
 June 5 - Maksim Batov, footballer
 June 8 - Dmitri Avramenko, footballer
 June 19 - Dmitry Barkov, footballer
 July 3 - Alena Adanichkina, triathlete  
 July 26 - Sergei Barbashev, ice hockey player
 August 3 - Denis Ablyazin, artistic gymnast
 August 16 - Islam Dzhabrailov, footballer
 September 29 – Marina Antipova, ice dancer
 October 20 – Ksenia Semenova, Olympic gymnast
 November 6 - Zakhar Arzamastsev, ice hockey player
 November 18 - Apti Aukhadov, weightlifter
 November 29 - Marina Antipova, ice dancer
 December 15 - Darya Dugina, journalist and political activist (d. 2022)
 December 31 - Artur Anisimov, footballer

Notable deaths in 1992

References

External links

 
1990s in Russia
Years of the 20th century in Russia